A total solar eclipse occurred on August 7, 1869. A solar eclipse occurs when the Moon passes between Earth and the Sun, thereby totally or partly obscuring the image of the Sun for a viewer on Earth. A total solar eclipse occurs when the Moon's apparent diameter is larger than the Sun's, blocking all direct sunlight, turning day into darkness. Totality occurs in a narrow path across Earth's surface, with the partial solar eclipse visible over a surrounding region thousands of kilometres wide.
It path of totality was visible from eastern Russia, Alaska, across Canada, and the northeastern United States. A partial eclipse occurred across all of North America.

Observations 

In 1869, astronomer and explorer George Davidson made a scientific trip to the Chilkat Valley of Alaska. He told the Chilkat Indians that he was especially anxious to observe a total eclipse of the sun that was predicted to occur the following day, August 7. This prediction was considered to have saved Davidson's expedition from an attack.

A photographic expedition was organized by Philadelphia's Henry Morton under the authority of John H. C. Coffin, U.S.N., Superintendent of the American Ephemeris and Nautical Almanac. The expedition observed the eclipse in Iowa at three stations: Burlington, Mount Pleasant, and Ottumwa, under the respective supervisions of Alfred M. Mayer, Henry Morton, and Charles Francis Himes (1838–1918).

Observations were also made by meteorology pioneers Cleveland Abbe and General Albert Myer, in Dakota Territory and Virginia, respectively.

Related eclipses 
It is a part of solar Saros 143.

Notes

References
 NASA graphics
 Googlemap
 NASA Besselian elements
 Sketch of Solar Corona  1869 August 7
 The Solar Eclipse of 7 August 1869 P 70: Coast Survey Report 1869, 126–127, Cambridge, August 20, 1869

1869 08 07
1869 in science
1869 08 07
August 1869 events